The 1985 Columbia Lions football team was an American football team that represented Columbia University during the 1985 NCAA Division I-AA football season. Amid a record-setting loss streak, Columbia finished last in the Ivy League. 

In their first and only season under head coach Jim Garrett, the Lions compiled an 0–10 record and were outscored 333 to 75. Bill Strack was the team captain.  

The Lions' winless (0–7) conference record was the worst in the Ivy League standings. Columbia was outscored 243 to 54 by Ivy opponents. 

By losing all of their games in 1985, the Lions extended a winless streak and a losing streak that began in 1983. They would not win or tie another game until an October 9, 1988, win against Princeton, an NCAA Division I record streak at the time. At the end of 1985, the streak stood at 24 games without a win, and 21 straight losses. 

Columbia played its homes games at Lawrence A. Wien Stadium in Upper Manhattan, in New York City.

Schedule

References

Columbia
Columbia Lions football seasons
College football winless seasons
Columbia Lions football